Serbia participated at the 2010 Winter Olympics in Vancouver, British Columbia, Canada. It was the first time the nation had participated in the Winter Olympics after competing as Serbia and Montenegro in the previous Olympics.

Alpine skiing

Biathlon

Bobsleigh

Serbia was allowed to enter in the four man event following reallocation from the FIBT on 26 January 2010.

Cross country skiing

See also
 Serbia at the Olympics
 Serbia at the 2010 Winter Paralympics

References

2010 in Serbian sport
Nations at the 2010 Winter Olympics
2010